The 1931–32 season was the 37th season of competitive football by Southampton, and the club's tenth in the Second Division of the Football League. After finishing in the top half of the Second Division league table for the past three seasons, the Saints struggled to challenge in 1931–32 and ended up finishing in 14th place, closer to relegation than promotion. Southampton's first season with manager George Kay started strongly, as the team picked up four wins in their first five matches and reached the top of the Second Division league table for the first time in the club's history. Form quickly deteriorated, however, and the club was briefly involved in a fight for survival in the new year. After picking up a few more wins, Southampton secured their safety and finished in 14th place with 14 wins, 14 draws and 14 losses.

In the 1931–32 FA Cup, Southampton again travelled to Roker Park to face First Division side Sunderland in the third round. This time the Saints forced a replay at The Dell after a goalless draw, but lost 4–2 to face elimination at the first hurdle for the fifth season running. The club ended the season with the annual Rowland Hospital Cup and Hampshire Benevolent Cup matches against local rivals Portsmouth, which they drew and lost, respectively. The Saints also competed in the inaugural Hampshire Combination Cup in April, beating Portsmouth in the semi-final and losing to Bournemouth & Boscombe Athletic in the final. Southampton played another four friendly matches during the campaign, beating sides from the Royal Air Force and the Southern Command, and losing to Exeter City and a side representing the Dutch FA.

Southampton used 34 different players during the 1931–32 season and had sixteen different goalscorers. Their top scorer was outside-left Johnny Arnold, who scored 20 goals in the Second Division and one in the Hampshire Combination Cup. Arthur Haddleton scored ten goals in the competition, followed by Arthur Wilson with seven league goals. Eleven players were signed by the club during the campaign, with eight released and sold to other clubs. The average attendance at The Dell during the 1931–32 season was 11,003. The highest attendance was 22,927 against Sunderland in the FA Cup third round replay. The highest league attendance was 22,353 against Chesterfield on 26 December 1931. The lowest attendance was 6,128 against Manchester United on 7 May 1931, in the final game of the Second Division season.

Background and transfers
At the end of the 1930–31 season, several players left Southampton. Scottish inside-right Jerry Mackie retired from football, having scored 24 times in 84 appearances during a three-year career with the Saints. Inside-left Laurie Cumming, who had fallen out of favour after "his temperament became suspect", joined Scottish club Alloa Athletic. Left-back Ted Hough, who had been at the club for almost ten years, signed for Southampton's local rivals Portsmouth in the First Division, who paid £200 for the player. Inside-left Ernie Warren also left the Saints for a second time, signing for Southern League side Peterborough & Fletton United. Centre-half Bill Stoddart joined Third Division South club Bristol Rovers in July, and inside-right Billy Stage left to join Great Harwood in the Lancashire Combination in August.

New Saints manager George Kay also signed three players during the summer. First was inside-right Frank Osborne from Tottenham Hotspur in June, who cost the club £450. Also brought in was amateur centre-forward Ted Drake from Winchester City, who signed a professional contract in November. In August, inside-forward Henry O'Grady joined from Port Vale in August. Later, in September, Welsh winger Frank Matson signed from Cardiff City, having previously made a guest appearance for the Saints in the 1931 Hampshire Benevolent Cup. Arthur Holt also signed from Hampshire League side Totton on amateur terms the same month, although would not turn professional until the following October. Also in September, outside-left Reg Watson was transferred to Rochdale. In October, the club signed Charlie Sillett from Barking Town, who initially filled in at centre-forward and later played in several other positions. Amateur forward Bill Charlton joined from Middlesex Wanderers in December.

During a period described by club historians as an "injury crisis", former centre-half George Harkus rejoined the club in February, alongside new Saints Supporters Club-funded outside-right Dick Neal from Derby County. With relegation to the Third Division South still a possibility, Southampton added another forward in March when they signed Tom Brewis from York City, after securing a loan from a club director due to financial difficulties. Outside-right Peter Cowper left around the same time to join Southport, having submitted a transfer request more than a year earlier. The final transfer was a trial for Witton Albion right-half Henry Belcher in April.

Players transferred in

Players transferred out

Players given trials

Players retired

Second Division

Southampton started the 1931–32 Second Division season with their strongest beginning to a campaign in the Football League to date, picking up four wins in their opening five games and reaching the top of the table for the first time in the club's history. The run started on 29 August 1931 with a 3–0 victory at home to promotion hopefuls Burnley; continued with a 3–2 win over Manchester United at Old Trafford, who had just been relegated from the First Division; included a 2–1 home defeat of Tottenham Hotspur, who had finished just three points shy of promotion the previous year; and ended in a 2–1 home win over mid-table side Bury. The stint at the top of the table was short, however, and after five more games the Saints were just hanging onto a top-ten position following defeats at the hands of promotion hopefuls Spurs, Stoke City, Wolverhampton Wanderers and Bradford Park Avenue. During the first ten games of the season, Arthur Haddleton set a new club record when he scored in eight consecutive games, which lasted until it was surpassed by Ron Davies in 1966, who scored ten consecutive matches in the club's first season in the top flight, on the way to finishing as the division's top scorer that year.

The Saints were never able to keep up a good run of results due to ongoing illness and injury problems – according to club historians, manager George Kay used a total of 30 players during the league campaign, including two goalkeepers, three right-backs, five left-backs, five right-halves, five centre-halves, two left-halves, nine outside-rights, nine inside-rights, six centre-forwards, seven inside-lefts and four outside-lefts. On 28 November the team lost 5–0 at Notts County, who had been recently promoted from the Third Division South, before suffering their biggest home league defeat the next week when they were thrashed 6–0 by Plymouth Argyle, who were fifth in the table at the time. By March the Saints were facing a battle against relegation, sitting 18th in the table just five points above the drop. However, a strong finish to the campaign saw the side pick up wins over Swansea Town, Nottingham Forest, Notts County and Plymouth Argyle, losing just once in their last eight fixtures and securing their Second Division status for another year. Southampton finished the season in 14th place with 14 wins, 14 draws and 14 losses – the same record as they had managed in 1922–23, their first season in the division.

List of match results

Final league table

Results by matchday

FA Cup

Southampton entered the 1931–32 FA Cup in the third round against First Division side Sunderland, who had knocked them out at the same stage the previous season. The match took place at Roker Park on 9 January and ended as a goalless draw, with club historians highlighting the defensive performances of goalkeeper Bert Scriven, right-back Bill Adams and centre-half Arthur Bradford, while suggesting that "Had Charlie Sillett made the most of his opportunities then there would have been no need for a replay". In the replay at The Dell four days later, the top-flight visitors quickly asserted their dominance in the first half with three goals against the "sluggish" hosts. The Saints reacted in the second half, with goals from Sillett and Michael Keeping giving the Second Division side a chance of a comeback, however a "glorious opportunity" missed by Johnny Arnold and a penalty for Sunderland later on sent Southampton out of the tournament in the third round for the fifth consecutive season.

Other matches
Outside of the league and the FA Cup, Southampton played eight additional first-team matches during the 1931–32 season. The first was a friendly match against a Royal Air Force side at The Dell in November, which the Saints won 4–0 thanks to a brace from Frank Matson and goals from Peter Dougall and Arthur Holt. A second friendly in January against Third Division South club Exeter City ended in a 2–0 loss, which was followed in March by a 6–1 thrashing at the hands of a team representing the Dutch FA in Rotterdam (the only goal for the visitors scored by Arthur Wilson). A final friendly, at a side representing the Southern Command, took place in April and ended in a 3–1 win for Southampton, thanks to goals from Johnny Arnold, Tom Brewis and Ted Drake.

Five days after the final friendly, Southampton hosted local rivals Portsmouth in the inaugural Hampshire Combination Cup, which also featured Third Division South sides Aldershot and Bournemouth & Boscombe Athletic. The Second Division hosts beat their top-flight visitors by a single goal, which was scored by Arnold in the 67th minute after Pompey goalkeeper Jock Gilfillan saved a shot from Matson. Portsmouth's Alec Mackie was involved in two incidents during the game, first committing a foul on Arnold in the first-half which led to the referee introducing a police officer on standby, and later being sent off following an "unfortunate incident". In the final at The Dell, the Saints lost 3–2 to Bournemouth & Boscombe Athletic despite a strike from Drake and an own goal.

Southampton and Portsmouth met again on 9 May in the Rowland Hospital Cup, the first of their annual end-of-season charity cup matches. Saints regulars Drake, Arnold and Frank Campbell were injured, leading manager George Kay to give official debuts to Holt at centre-forward and Henry Belcher at right-half. Dick Neal gave the hosts the lead before Jimmy Easson equalised for the visitors, and later Holt's first official goal was cancelled out by another leveller from Fred Worrall. Two days later, the sides met for the third time in a month at Fratton Park for the Hampshire Benevolent Cup. The hosts thrashed the Saints 5–1, with the visitors once again playing with alumni George Harkus and Bill Rawlings in the absence of a full squad. Southampton went ahead after just four minutes, when Neal headed in a cross from Bill Luckett after a move started by Rawlings, but were quickly dominated by Pompey who scored through Frederick Cook, Jack Weddle, Worrall and Easson (twice).

Player details
Southampton used 34 different players during the 1931–32 season, 16 of whom scored during the campaign. The team played in a 2–3–5 formation throughout, using two full-backs, three half-backs, two outside forwards, two inside forwards and a centre-forward. Club captain Bill Adams made the most appearances for the club during the campaign, playing in every match of the season except the Hampshire Benevolent Cup. Left-half Bill Luckett appeared in all but four league games, and outside-left Johnny Arnold featured in all but five league fixtures, the Hampshire Benevolent Cup and the Rowland Hospital Cup. Arnold finished as the season's top scorer with 20 goals in the Second Division and one in the Hampshire Combination Cup, followed by Arthur Haddleton on ten league goals and Arthur Wilson, who scored seven in the competition. Johnny McIlwaine was the highest-scoring half-back of the season with two goals, while full-backs Charlie Sillett and Michael Keeping scored five and three goals, respectively.

Squad statistics

Most appearances

Top goalscorers

Footnotes

References

Bibliography

External links
Southampton F.C. official website

Southampton F.C. seasons
Southampton